Timberyard may refer to:

 Lumber yard, a place for selling lumber or timber
 Timberyard Records, an Australian record label
 Timberyard Social Housing in Dublin, Ireland, a winner of the RIBA International Award
 Timberyard Layout, a neighborhood of Bangalore